Bernie Brennan (born October 1, 1927) is a Canadian Football League player.

Coming straight out of St. Patrick's High School and at the age of 19, Brennan joined the Ottawa Rough Riders in 1946 and won the first Gruen Trophy for best rookie in the eastern Big Four. After one more season with the Riders he returned to school, studying veterinary medicine at Ontario Veterinarian College at the Ontario Agricultural College. He was a star with their football team, enshrined in the Guelph Gryphons Sports Hall of Fame in 1991. He then returned to the Rough Riders in 1951, helping them win a Grey Cup championship.

Brennan was also a skilled hockey player, playing for the 1947-48 Kemptville Royals, a championship senior men's hockey team in the St. Lawrence League and the Ottawa District Hockey Association, and the Brockville Magedomas in 1951.

After his playing days he became director of Rideau Carleton Raceway, where he was appointed track veterinarian. Dr. Brennan is a member of the Ontario Racing Commission. He has been elected into the North Grenville Sports Hall of Fame.

Notes

1927 births
Living people
Ottawa Rough Riders players
Players of Canadian football from Ontario
Canadian Football League Rookie of the Year Award winners